The Mayor of Roxbury was the head of the municipal government in Roxbury, Massachusetts. There was no Mayor of Roxbury until 1846 because up to that point Roxbury was still incorporated as a town. When Roxbury was annexed by the City of Boston in 1868, the position was abolished.

List of mayors

See also
List of mayors of Boston, Massachusetts (Most current mayors)

Roxbury